Victor John Ostrovsky (born 28 November 1949) is an author and a former katsa (case officer) for the Israeli Mossad. He authored two nonfiction books about his service with the Mossad: By Way of Deception, a #1 New York Times bestseller in 1990, and The Other Side of Deception several years later.

Family
Ostrovsky's mother, a gymnastics teacher by trade, was born in Mandatory Palestine to Haim and Esther Margolin, (his grandparents) who fled Russia in 1912 and settled in Palestine where Haim served as Auditor General of the Jewish National Fund (JNF), and Esther volunteered to the British Army (ATS), as truck driver during World War II, and later joined the Haganah to fight for Israel's independence from the British mandate rule.

Ostrovsky's father was a Canadian-born Jew who served with the Royal Canadian Air Force during World War II as a tail gunner on a Lancaster bomber, taking part in more than 20  missions over Germany. His plane was shot down over Germany, but he managed to escape and return to active service. After the war, he joined the Israeli military to fight in the 1948 Arab–Israeli War, rising to command Sde Dov, an Israeli Air Force base in Israel.

Ostrovsky's grandmother, a Russian immigrant, introduced him to noted Israeli artist Aharon Giladi, who lived on the same street, and who bought paints and canvasses for him. Giladi mentored Ostrovsky for more than 10 years.

Early life
He was born in Edmonton, Alberta, Canada, on 28 November 1949, and he moved to Israel at the age of five.

Career
Ostrovsky joined the Israeli Youth Brigade at 14 and quickly became an expert marksman, finishing second in a 1964 national shooting competition, with a score of 192 out of 200. At the age of 17, he joined the Israel Defense Forces (IDF) after a minor eye condition ended his hopes of becoming a pilot. He was assigned to the Military Police and rose to command the Nablus Military Police Base. Later, he was made commanding officer of the Military Police West Bank Central Command.

After his service with the Military Police, he spent six years in the Israeli Navy. He was selected to attend the Staff and Command School and attained the rank of Lieutenant Commander. Ostrovsky was placed in charge of all Navy weapons testing. He helped introduce the Harpoon surface-to-surface missile to the Saar missile boats as well as the Vulcan Phalanx anti-missile defense system.

According to court papers filed by the Israeli government in an attempt to stop the publication of his book By Way of Deception, Ostrovsky was recruited by the Mossad in 1984 and trained as a katsa (case officer) at the Mossad's training school north of Tel Aviv.

In 1986, he says that he left the agency saying it was because of what he considered cases of unnecessarily-malicious actions by Mossad operatives. He also accused its directors of knowingly making less-than-accurate reports to the nation's political leadership. However, historian Benny Morris states that Ostrovsky's two years in the Mossad were mostly spent as a trainee, and he wouldn't have had access to many operational secrets before he was fired.

His wife, Bella Ostrovsky, died on January 8, 2015, at 65.

He operated Ostrovsky Fine Art Gallery in Scottsdale, Arizona. While he has painted many subjects, he is best known for his Metaphors of Espionage collection, inspired by his days as a spy for the Mossad.

By Way of Deception
In 1990, he published By Way of Deception to draw attention to the corruption and shortcomings that he claims to have witnessed in the Mossad. He has repeatedly argued that intelligence-gathering agencies must be permitted certain operational freedoms but that significantly-increased governmental oversight of espionage activities is necessary.

Without effective oversight, he has said that the Mossad cannot achieve its full potential and value. According to Ostrovsky, if a US senator on a military committee whose "aide was Jewish, he or she would be approached as a sayan," which Ostrovsky later defines as "a volunteer Jewish helper outside Israel" who would then assist Mossad. Of the Israeli spy network in the United States, David Wise wrote in his New York Times review that "both countries know that Israel has spied on the United States for years" and that from publicly known instances, the "general assertion can hardly be challenged."

Many of Ostrovsky's claims have neither been verified from other sources nor been refuted, and arguments continue to rage over the credibility of his accounts. However, he was named in a lawsuit by the Israeli government, which claimed that he was part of the Mossad. Critics such as Benny Morris, have argued that the book is essentially a novel; or in the case of David Wise, that much of it reads like  a "supermarket tabloid," and that a case officer would not have had access to so many operational secrets. They write that intelligence organizations practice strict compartmentalization of confidential or secretive information. Ostrovsky argued their point to be moot, as they themselves are outsiders and that the only information about the Mossad they have is from their supposed "sources" in the agency with a very clear agenda. Ostrovsky also points out that the need-to-know rule was not closely followed in the Mossad because of its small size and the need for case officers to fill many roles.

Shortly before the official publication of the book, the Israeli government filed lawsuits in both Canada and the United States, seeking injunctions against publication. A judge for the Manhattan Supreme Court granted the request at a 1 a.m. hearing in his home. The New York Supreme Court overturned his decision, but the resulting publicity focused national attention on Ostrovsky's story and guaranteed international success.

Concerns were expressed by the Israeli government that by exposing certain prior operations, the book endangered the lives of agency personnel. Ostrovsky maintains that he never placed anyone in danger because only first names or code names were used. Furthermore, Ostrovsky says the Mossad was privately allowed to see the book before publication to ensure that lives were not placed in danger.

The Other Side of Deception
He wrote a sequel, The Other Side of Deception, in which he gives more anecdotes and defends his earlier work with a list of newspaper articles

Works

Books
By Way of Deception (1990)
Lion of Judah (1993)
The Other Side of Deception (1995)
Black Ghosts (1999)

Articles (partial)
 Bungled Amman Assassination Plot Exposes Rift Within Israeli Government Over Peace Negotiations Washington Report on Middle East Affairs, December 1997, Pages 7–8, 92
 Israel's "False Information Affair" Sheds New Light On Troubled Israeli and U.S. Relations With Syria WRMEA, January/February 1998, Pages 13–14
 At Age 50, Israel Should Admit Its Responsibility to Jonathan Pollard, WRMEA, May/June 1998, Page 45
 Israeli Finger on the Nuclear Trigger Could Turn the Next Israeli-Arab War Into a Conflagration, WRMEA, December 1998, pages 48, 92
 Crash of Cargo Plane in Holland Revealed Existence of Israeli Chemical and Biological Weapons Plant, WRMEA, December 1998, pages 19–20
  Combat Units Manned by West Bank Settlers Puts Trojan Horse Within the Future Palestinian State, WRMEA, January/February 1999, pages 26, 94
 The Israeli-Palestinian Summit: A Reality Check, WRMEA, August/September 2000, Page 13

References

External links
 
 Washington-report.org
  a documentary of the Lillehammer affair by Victor Ostrovsky

1949 births
Living people
Historians of espionage
Canadian emigrants to Israel
Canadian male non-fiction writers
Jewish Canadian writers
People of the Mossad
Writers from Edmonton